John George Cobbe (1859 – 29 December 1944) was a New Zealand politician of the Liberal Party, United Party and the National Party.

Early life
Cobbe was born in King's County, Ireland, in 1859. He received his education in Tullamore and Dublin, and arrived in New Zealand in 1886. He was first employed in Auckland by Smith & Caughey, and then moved to Feilding to run a general store. In 1941, he became a sheep farmer in the Waihapi Valley north of the Whanganui River.

Politics and public offices

He represented the Oroua electorate from 1928 to 1938, having stood and come second in 1922 and 1925. He then represented the Manawatu electorate from 1938 to 1943, when he retired.

He was a cabinet minister from 1928 to 1935 in the United Government and the Liberal-Reform coalition Government; Minister of Defence from 1929 to 1935, Minister of Justice from 1930 to 1935, Minister of Marine from 1928 to 1930 and 1931 to 1935, Minister of Immigration from 1928 to 1930, and Minister of Industries and Commerce from 1928 to 1929 in the Ward and Forbes Ministries of the United Government.

He held a large number of public offices. He was the first chairman of the Feilding Chamber of Commerce. He was chairman of directors of the Feilding Farmers' Freezing Company. From 1911 to 1929, he represented Manawatu on the Wellington Harbour Board. For a time, he was the chairman of the Harbour Boards' Association of New Zealand.

In 1935, he was awarded the King George V Silver Jubilee Medal.

Family and death
Cobbe married Frances Amelia Elders, the daughter of Richard Elders of Phillipstown, Feilding. They had three sons, Ernest, Maurice, Richard, and one daughter. One son, Ernest Cobbe, died in action in Ypres, Belgium, in 1917; son, Maurice Cobbe, survived the war. His wife died during the 1935 election campaign on 24 November 1935. He died on 29 December 1944 at a private hospital in Palmerston North and was buried in Feilding. Three great-great-granchildren, Jon, Peter and Dann Hume were raised in Feilding where they formed a rock group, Evermore in 1999.

Further reading

This is a facsimile (i.e. reprint) edition of the original work noted above.

The three editions of the above work are noted for the sake of completeness. Cobbe was the local MP for the area in 1936, and contributed a foreword for the book.

This is a letter from the author to Cobbe, who was Minister of Justice at the time. It is reprinted from the New Zealand Samoa Guardian of 13 November 1930 (n.p.).

Notes

References

|-

|-

|-

1859 births
1944 deaths
Irish emigrants to New Zealand (before 1923)
Members of the Cabinet of New Zealand
New Zealand defence ministers
New Zealand Liberal Party MPs
New Zealand National Party MPs
United Party (New Zealand) MPs
Members of the New Zealand House of Representatives
New Zealand MPs for North Island electorates
Unsuccessful candidates in the 1922 New Zealand general election
Unsuccessful candidates in the 1925 New Zealand general election
People from County Offaly
Wellington Harbour Board members
Justice ministers of New Zealand